"Tragedy in a Temporary Town" is a dramatic teleplay written by Reginald Rose. It was originally produced for The Alcoa Hour in the US directed by Sidney Lumet and sparked media attention for its portrayal of race and for Lloyd Bridges ad libbed profanity during its live broadcast. Bridges was nominated for the Emmy Award for Best Single Performance by an Actor for 1957 but did not win.

In 1959, the same script was produced as the third episode of the Australian anthology drama show Shell Presents starring Michael Pate.

Plot 
In a small town, a group of migrant workers are employed at an aircraft factory and live in a trailer park. When 15 year-old Dotty Fisher claims she has been attacked, a group of men, led by Frank Doran, attempt to find out who is possible. They seize a boy, Raphael Infante, and threaten to lynch him.  Only a tolerant man called Alec Beggs dares to stand up to the mob in an attempt to stop them.

Cast 
For the 1956 Alcoa Hour Production:

 Edward Binns as Anderson
 Lloyd Bridges as Alec Beggs
 Rafael Campos as Raphael Infante
 Robert Dryden as Sankey
 Robert Emhardt as Matt Fisher
 Pete Gumeny as Reynolds
 Donald Harron as Mickey Doran
 Betty Lou Keim as Dotty Fisher
 Will Kuluva as Julio Infante
 Vivian Nathan as Grace Beggs
 Milton Selzer as Pike
 Clifford Tatum Jr. as Buddy Beggs
 Jack Warden as Frank Doran
 Jane White as Dolores Infante

Reception 
The US production garnered press in February 1956 for actor Lloyd Bridges' emotional performance during which Bridges inadvertently slipped some profanity in while ad-libbing. Although the slip of the lip and the racial content generated some complaints, most of the public feedback was positive. The episode won a Robert E. Sherwood Television Award, with Bridges' slip being defended even by some members of the clergy. The episode, during which an innocent Puerto Rican man is targeted by a mob for a sexual crime, was cited by the Anti-Defamation League as "the best dramatic program of the year dealing with interethnic group relations."

References 

1956 American television episodes